Reinagle is a surname. Notable people with the surname include:

Alexander Reinagle (1756–1809), English-born American composer and organist
Caroline Reinagle (born Orger) (1818–1892), English composer, pianist, and writer
George Philip Reinagle (1802–1835), English marine painter, son of Ramsay Richard Reinagle
Hugh Reinagle (c. 1790–1834), American painter
Joseph Reinagle (1762–1836), English music composer and cellist
Philip Reinagle (1749–1833), English animal, landscape and botanical painter
Ramsay Richard Reinagle (1775–1862), English portrait, landscape and animal painter, and son of Philip Reinagle